Sebastian is a town in northern Victoria, Australia.  The town is located 22 km north of Bendigo and is in the City of Greater Bendigo.

It was named after Sebastian Schmidt, who discovered gold there in May 1863.

The railway line through Sebastian was opened in 1882 and eventually made it to Swan Hill.

Demographics
The median age of persons in Sebastian was 40 years. There were more males than females, with 51.4% of the population male and 48.6% female. The average household size was 2.7 people per household.

References

External links

Towns in Victoria (Australia)
Bendigo
Suburbs of Bendigo